English new wave band Duran Duran have released 15 studio albums, four live albums, four compilation albums, two remix albums, two box sets, seven extended plays, 46 singles and 14 video albums. Duran Duran have sold over 100 million records. The band have achieved UK top-five albums in five consecutive decades (1980s to 2020s), and US top-10 albums in three decades (1980s, 1990s and 2010s).

Albums

Studio albums

Live albums

Compilation albums

Remix albums

Box sets

Extended plays

Singles

1980s

1990s

2000s–present

Guest appearances

Videography

Video albums

Music videos

 "Planet Earth" (1981)
 "Careless Memories" (1981)
 "Girls on Film" (1981)
 "My Own Way" (1981)
 "Friends Of Mine" (1981)
 "Hungry Like the Wolf" (1982)
 "Save a Prayer" (1982)
 "Lonely in Your Nightmare" (1982)
 "Rio" (1982)
 "Night Boat" (1982)
 "The Chauffeur" (1982)
 "Is There Something I Should Know?" (1983)
 "Union of the Snake" (1983)
 "New Moon on Monday" (1984)
 "The Reflex" (1984)
 "The Wild Boys" (1984)
 "Save a Prayer" (Live) (1985)
 "A View to a Kill" (1985)
 "Notorious" (1986)
 "Skin Trade" (1987)
 "Meet El Presidente" (1987)
 "I Don't Want Your Love" (1988)
 "All She Wants Is" (1988)
 "Do You Believe in Shame?" (1989)
 "Burning the Ground" (1989)
 "Violence of Summer (Love's Taking Over)" (1990)
 "Serious" (1990)
 "Ordinary World" (1993)
 "Come Undone" (1993)
 "Too Much Information" (1993)
 "Breath After Breath" (1993)
 "Femme Fatale" (1993)
 "Perfect Day" (1995)
 "White Lines (Don't Do It)" (1995)
 "Out of My Mind" (1997)
 "Electric Barbarella" (1997)
 "Someone Else Not Me" (2000)
 "(Reach Up for The) Sunrise" (2004)
 "What Happens Tomorrow" (2005)
 "Nice" (2006)
 "Falling Down" (2007)
 "Make Me Smile (Come Up and See Me)" (2009)
 "All You Need Is Now" (2010)
 "Girl Panic!" (2011)
 "Hungry Like the Wolf (Steve Aoki Remix)" (2012)
 "Pressure Off"  (feat. Janelle Monáe and Nile Rodgers) (2015)
 "Pressure Off" [OFFICIAL 360 LYRIC VIDEO] (2015)
 "Last Night in the City" (2016)
 "Face for Today (Official Music Video) (2017)
 "The Edge of America" (2018)
 "Five Years" (2021)
 "Invisible" (2021)
 "Anniversary" (2021)
 "MORE JOY! (feat. CHAI) [Lyric Video]" (2021)
 "Ball and Chain (Official Lyric Video)" (2022)
 "Anniversary (Duran Duran All-Toy Funko Pop line Version 
created by Los Angeles Fan/Director) (2022)

Record label timeline
 1980–1999: EMI Capitol/Parlophone
 1999–2001: Hollywood Records
 2004–2009: Epic Records/Sony BMG
 2010–2012: Tapemodern/S-Curve Records
 2015–2021: Warner Bros. Records
 2021–present: BMG

Explanatory notes

References

External links
 
 
 

Duran Duran
Discographies of British artists
Pop music group discographies
Rock music group discographies
New wave discographies